Sydney Rayner (September 12, 1895 – September 14, 1981) was an American operatic tenor.

Born in New Orleans, Rayner went to Milan in 1924 for vocal studies, which led to his debut in 1927, in Rome, as Rodolfo in La bohème.  He was often heard at the Opéra-Comique and the Berlin Staatsoper.

On May 23, 1936, the dramatic tenor made his Metropolitan Opera debut, as Don José in Carmen, opposite Bruna Castagna.  He appeared with that company through 1938, in Aïda (with Elisabeth Rethberg), Cavalleria rusticana (with Rosa Ponselle), Carmen again (opposite Ponselle), Les contes d'Hoffmann (conducted by Maurice Abravanel and directed by Herbert Graf), Manon (with Bidu Sayão in her Met debut, later with Grace Moore), Faust, and Pagliacci (opposite Robert Weede in his Met debut).

The tenor recorded for Decca and Sonabel.  In 1943, Rayner sang in La forza del destino, opposite Herva Nelli, at the Brooklyn Academy of Music.

Rayner died, aged 86, in East Patchogue, New York.

External links 
 Sydney Rayner in an excerpt from Manon (audio only, 1937).

References 

Metropolitan Opera (Performance archives on the MetOpera Database). Rayner, Sydney (Tenor). 
The New York Times (September 15, 1981). "Sydney Rayner, 86; Tenor at Met Opera in the 30s, is Dead". 

American operatic tenors
Musicians from New Orleans
1895 births
1981 deaths
20th-century American male opera singers
Singers from Louisiana
American expatriates in Italy
Classical musicians from Louisiana